La Encantada is a corregimiento in Chagres District, Colón Province, Panama with a population of 2,561 as of 2010. Its population as of 1990 was 2,532; its population as of 2000 was 2,523.

References

Corregimientos of Colón Province